The attorney general of British Columbia (AG) oversees the Ministry of Attorney General, a provincial government department responsible for the oversight of the justice system, within the province of British Columbia, Canada. The attorney general is a member of the provincial cabinet, typically a member of Legislative Assembly who is chosen by the premier of British Columbia and formally appointed by the lieutenant governor of British Columbia.

The attorney general is responsible for ensuring that public administration is conducted according to the law and as such, they are the chief advisor of law to the government, in addition to overseeing the court system and Sheriff Service. Under the King's Counsel Act, the attorney general is automatically appointed a King's Counsel upon swearing into office. The attorney general also serves as an ex officio bencher of the Law Society of British Columbia. A separate cabinet position, the Minister of Public Safety and Solicitor General, administers the province's law enforcement agencies (police, prisons and security).

Since December 7, 2022, the post has been held by Niki Sharma.

List of attorneys general of the Colony of British Columbia
George Hunter Cary; 1859–1861
Henry Pering Pellew Crease; 1861–1870
George Phillippo; 1870–1871

List of attorneys general of the province of British Columbia
John Foster McCreight; 1871–1872
George Anthony Walkem; 1871–1874
A. E. B. Davie; 1882–(1887?)
John Roland Hett; 
Theodore Davie; 1889–1892
Joseph Martin; 1898–1900
Albert Edward McPhillips; (1900?)–1903
Charles Wilson; 1903–1906
Frederick John Fulton; 1906–1907
William John Bowser; 1907–1915
Malcolm Archibald Macdonald; 1915–1917
John Wallace de Beque Farris; 1917–1922
Alexander Malcolm Manson; 1922–1928
Gordon Sloan; 1933–1937
Gordon Wismer; 1937–1941
Royal Lethington Maitland; 1941–1946
Gordon Wismer; 1946–1952
Robert Bonner; 1952–1968
Leslie Peterson; 1968–1972
Alex MacDonald; 1972–1975
Garde Gardom; 1975–1979
Allan Williams; 1979–1983
Brian Smith; 1983–1988
Bud Smith; 1988–1990
Russell Fraser; 1990–1991
Colin Gabelmann; 1991–1995
Ujjal Dosanjh; 1995–2000
Andrew Petter; 2000
Graeme Bowbrick; 2000–2001
Geoff Plant; 2001–2005
Wally Oppal; 2005–2009
Mike de Jong; 2009–2010
Barry Penner; 2010–2011
Shirley Bond; 2011–2013
Suzanne Anton; 2013–2017
Andrew Wilkinson; 2017
David Eby; 2017–2022
Murray Rankin; 2022
Niki Sharma; since 2022

See also

 Justice ministry
 Politics of British Columbia

References

External links
Ministry of Attorney General
Ministry of Attorney General Service Plan

British Columbia government departments and agencies

British Columbia
1859 establishments in the British Empire
British Columbia